Institute of Banking & Finance offers higher education in Business Administration. It  is a department of Bahauddin Zakariya University Multan. 
Faculty is highly qualified. Prominently Dr. Muhammad Shaukat Malik, The pioneer director of the institute has worked hard to make this institute a leading institute  in the region.  Dr.  Muhammad Irfan has joined the department in  2014 and since then he is working hard for the betterment of the institute.

Programs of study
 PhD (Business Administration)
 MS (Business Administration)
 MBA 1.5 Years (Finance, HRM) 
 MBA (Banking & Finance)
 MBA (Human Resource Management)
 MBA (Marketing of Financial Services)
 BBA (Banking & Finance)
 MSC (Insurance and Risk Management)

South Asian Journal of Banking and Social Sciences
Alfalah Institute of Banking and Finance was established in 2012 at Bahauddin Zakariya University Multan. Within a short span of three years, the institute has managed to establish its mark and has attained recognition as a primer institute of South Punjab. Efforts have been made to develop a strong research culture within the institute and students are encouraged to undertake practical projects and research studies. South Asian Journal of Banking and Social Sciences (SAJBS) is an effort of the institute towards this cause. Purpose of this research journal is to publish original and quality research in the disciplines of Banking, Finance, Management and Social Sciences. The journal is published in accordance with the guidelines issued by the Higher Education Commission, Pakistan.

SAJBS is a double-blind peer reviewed journal that will be published on a bi-annual basis by Bahauddin Zakariya University, Multan. The research papers included in the journal covers a wide variety of subjects, both applied and theoretical in nature. The aim of SAJBS is to be widely accepted and read amongst university teachers, researchers, governmental and non-governmental institutions.

References

Bahauddin Zakariya University